Off the Record is a 1947 British comedy play by Ian Hay and Stephen King-Hall. It is a farce about the Royal Navy.

It premiered at the King's Theatre, Edinburgh prior to its London run. In the West End it ran for 702 performances from 3 June 1947 to 12 February 1949, initially at the Apollo Theatre before transferring to the Piccadilly Theatre. The cast included Hugh Wakefield, Hubert Gregg, Roger Maxwell, and Tom Gill.

In 1957 it was adapted into the British comedy film Carry on Admiral

References

Bibliography
 Wearing, J.P. The London Stage 1940-1949: A Calendar of Productions, Performers, and Personnel.  Rowman & Littlefield, 2014.

1947 plays
Plays by Ian Hay
Plays by Stephen King-Hall
Comedy plays
West End plays
British plays adapted into films